South Carolina Highway 32 (SC 32) was a state highway that existed in the southern part of Colleton County. It connected the Henderson and Jacksonboro areas.

Route description
SC 32 began at an intersection with SC 30 (now U.S. Route 17 Alternate (US 17 Alt.)) south-southwest of Henderson. It traveled to the east-southeast to Ritter. It then proceeded to the east-northeast to SC 6 (now SC 64) west-northwest of Jacksonboro.

History
SC 32 was an original state highway, being established at least as early as 1922. It was decommissioned in 1925 or 1926. It was downgraded to a secondary road. Today, it is known as Ritter Road.

Major intersections

See also

References

External links
Former SC 32 at the Virginia Highways South Carolina Annex

032 (1920s)
Transportation in Colleton County, South Carolina